The Senate Armed Services Subcommittee on Readiness and Management Support is one of seven subcommittees within the Senate Armed Services Committee.

Jurisdiction
The Readiness and Management Support subcommittee has oversight of military readiness, including training, logistics and maintenance, defense environmental programs, business operations and working capital funds, real property maintenance, military construction, Base Realignment and Closure, Armed Forces Retirement Home, readiness procurement and military depots, shipyards, ammunition plants, and arsenals.

Members, 118th Congress

Historical subcommittee rosters

117th Congress

116th Congress

115th Congress

See also

U.S. House Armed Services Subcommittee on Readiness

External links
Senate Armed Services Committee home page
Senate Armed Services Committee subcommittee list and membership page

Armed Services Readiness